George Town Cricket Club (GTCC) is a cricket team which represents the town of George Town in the Northern Tasmanian Cricket Association grade cricket competition, in the Australian state of Tasmania.

The GTCC is represented by three teams known as the "Tamar Saints" in the NTCA competition. The GTCC has been consistently successful throughout its history, most recently winning the 2006/07 3rd Grade Priemiership, and following it up by going back to back in 2007/08.

George Town's home ground Crothers Oval is named after former games record holder and life member, Peter Crothers. The oval is the best seeing ground in the competition outside of the NTCA ground, with elevated views available from both sides of the field. Crothers Oval is also home to one of the most consistent centre wickets in the NTCA despite the club relying on volunteers to complete the pitch preparation rather than a full-time curator.

The last three years have been a trying time for the club, with its mostly poor performances in the higher grades owing to dwindling player numbers and a lack of sponsorship. However, recent recruiting strategies and successes and a reshuffling of personnel mean that the club will soon return to A Grade success. For the 2008/09 season, Forest Enterprises Australia has secured naming rights for the GTCC, and the teams will be known as "FEA George Town".

The 2009/10 season is shaping up as a year of rebuilding for the club, however the procurement of coach Michael Doherty's services has brought a sense of expectation and excitement to the playing group.

George Town have pulled out of the NTCA competition since the 2015 season, whilst still entering teams into the 2nd and 3rd grade competitions.

Honours
 NTCA Premierships: 2006/07 3rd Grade

External links
 George Town Cricket Club Website

Tasmanian grade cricket clubs